Lesná is a municipality and village in Znojmo District in the South Moravian Region of the Czech Republic. It has about 300 inhabitants.

Notable people
August Reuß (1871–1935), German composer

References

Populated places in Znojmo District